Clementine Maersk is a container ship of the Maersk Line. The ship was built in 2002 in the shipyard of Odense Steel and has a capacity of 6,600 TEUs according to company statistics and calculations.

Design 
Clementine Maersk was built in 2002 in the ship-yard of Odense Steel in Denmark and sails under the Danish flag. Clementine Maersk has a deadweight of 109,696 metric tons and a gross tonnage of 91,921 gross tons. The ship has a net tonnage of 53,625 net tons and a cargo capacity of 6,600 container (TEU). The length of the vessel is 347.00 meters, while the moulded beam is 43.00 meters. When the ship is fully loaded with cargo she reaches the maximum draft of 14,50 meters.

References 

Container Ships

Container ships
Ships built in Odense
Merchant ships of Denmark
2002 ships
Ships of the Maersk Line